Ženski fudbalski / nogometni klub Emina Mostar (English: Women's football club Emina Mostar) is a women's professional football club from the city of Mostar, Bosnia and Herzegovina. The club competes in the highest level of women's football in Bosnia and Herzegovina, the Bosnia and Herzegovina Women's Premier League. The club was established in May 2016 and the name was taken from a famous woman from Mostar, Emina Sefić. It competed in the Second Federal League of BiH (South) in the 2016/2017 season, then in the First Federal League of BiH, and now it is member of the highest level of competition, the Premier League. In the 2016/2017 season, Emina was finalist of the BiH Cup.

Honours

Domestic competitions

League
 Bosnia and Herzegovina Women's Premier League (0):

Cups
 Bosnia and Herzegovina Women's Football Cup (0) :

Staff

Club management

Players

Current squad

References

External links

ŽF/NK Emina Mostar Official website 
ŽF/NK Emina Mostar at UEFA.com 
ŽF/NK Emina Mostar at N/FSBiH 

 
2016 establishments in Bosnia and Herzegovina
Association football clubs established in 2016
Football clubs in Bosnia and Herzegovina
Bosnia and Herzegovina women's football clubs
Sport in Mostar